Naumovia may refer to:
 Naumovia, a genus of hydrozoa in the family Kirchenpaueriidae; synonym of Kirchenpaueria
 Naumovia Dobrozrakova, 1928, a genus of fungi; synonym of Rosenscheldia
 Naumovia Kurtzman, 2003, a genus of fungi in the family Saccharomycetaceae; synonym of Naumovozyma